Kovachevski (also transliterated Kovačevski) is a Bulgarian surname. Notable people with the surname include:
 (1860–1949), a Bulgarian architect

See also
Kovačevski (Ковачевски), surname
Kovach (surname) (Ковач; also translit. Kovač), surname
Kovachev (Ковачев; also translit. Kovačev), a surname
Kovachich (Ковачич; also translit. Kovačič), a surname
Kovachevich (Ковачевич; also translit. Kovačevič), a surname
Kovachenko (Коваченко; also translit. Kovačenko), a surname

Bulgarian-language surnames
English-language surnames